Papuligobius is a genus of fish in the goby subfamily, Gobionellinae, native to Southeast Asia. It was erected in 2003 to house the species P. uniporus, newly described from Laos. A second species, P. ocellatus, was transferred from genus Rhinogobius at the same time.

Species
The genus includes:
 Papuligobius ocellatus (Fowler, 1937)
 Papuligobius uniporus I. S. Chen & Kottelat, 2003

References

Gobionellinae